Martin Carney is an Irish former Gaelic footballer.

Since retirement, Carney has maintained a national presence as commentator for RTÉ and TV analyst with The Sunday Game.

Early life
Born in Bundoran, County Donegal, although he was raised in Ballyshannon, Carney was educated at St Eunan's College, Letterkenny, played Gaelic football for the school team, and is the older brother of former college president Michael Carney. He is one of three footballers from the twentieth century to have played for the Donegal county football team while still attending the college; the others are Seamus Hoare and Paul McGettigan. Another brother, Dermot, was principal at St Ciaran's Community School in Kells and lives in nearby Athboy; Martin Carney is a nephew of Jackie Carney.

Sporting career
Carney is a former inter-county footballer for Donegal and Mayo.

In 2002 and 2003, he was one of the selection team for the Coca-Cola International Rules Series.

Carney emerged as favourite to take over from John Maughan as manager of the Mayo senior football side but quickly ruled himself out of contention. John O'Mahony became manager, with Carney acting as a statistician and video analyst.

He has experience of management with Mayo in the past, taking the U21 football side to two All-Ireland finals in 1994 and 1995, both which they failed to win, as the minors did in 1991 also.

In May 2012, the Irish Independent named him in its selection of Donegal's "greatest team" spanning the previous 50 years.

Professional life
Carney is former principal at Scoil Mhuire agus Padraig in Swinford.

Career statistics

References

1952 births
Living people
Aodh Ruadh Gaelic footballers
Donegal inter-county Gaelic footballers
Gaelic games commentators
Heads of schools in Ireland
Mayo inter-county Gaelic footballers
People educated at St Eunan's College
People from Ballyshannon